Millbank is a small village in County Antrim, Northern Ireland. It is mostly within the townland of Carnanee, slightly north of Roughfort, between Templepatrick and Newtownabbey. In the 2001 Census it had a population of 93 people. It is in Newtownabbey Borough Council area.

See also 
List of towns and villages in Northern Ireland

References 
NI Neighbourhood Information System

Villages in County Antrim